The 2006 TC 2000 Championship was the 28th Turismo Competicion 2000 season.

Final standings

Race calendar and winners

References

External links
Official site (Spanish)

TC 2000 Championship seasons
TC2000
TC2000